Cornelio "Elio" Veltri (born 8 May 1938) is an Italian journalist and politician. He has been an author of several books and reports about illegality in the Italian economical and political world.

Biography
Veltri was born at Longobardi, in Calabria, and graduated in medicine at the University of Pavia. Later he taught hemopathology in the same institute. In 1973-1980 he was mayor of Pavia as member of the Italian Socialist Party (Partito Socialista Italiano, or PSI), becoming the first mayor in Europe to forbid the historical center of his city to cars.

In 1981, in polemics with PSI's then secretary Bettino Craxi about the growing bribery involvement of its members, he was expelled together with Franco Bassanini, Tristano Codignola and others. In 1985 he was elected in the Lombardy regional council for the far-left  party Democrazia Proletaria. In the period of the large bribing scandal Tangentopoli, he published the essays Milano degli scandali ("Milan of  the Scandals", 1991) and Da Craxi a Craxi ("From Craxi to Craxi", 1992).

In 1996 he was elected to the Italian Chamber of Deputies for L'Ulivo/PDS, and became a member of the parliamentary commissions dealing with mafia and corruption. The following year Veltri founded the association Democrazia e Legalità ("Democracy and Legality") which has published an online journal since 2001 and, in 1998, he was one of the founded of the  Italia dei Valori party.

Veltri in 2001 published L'odore dei soldi ("The Money Smell"), a report about bribery in Italy written with other investigative journalist Marco Travaglio. In 2001 he founded Opposizione Civile ("Civil Opposition"), later merged  in the "Cantiere per il Bene Comune". In June 2007, together with journalist Oliviero Beha, Veltri founded Lista Civica dei Cittadini per la Repubblica (also called Lista Civica Nazionale).

External links
Democrazia e Legalità official website 

1938 births
Living people
People from the Province of Cosenza
Italian Socialist Party politicians
Democratic Party of the Left politicians
20th-century Italian politicians
Proletarian Democracy politicians
Italy of Values politicians